Death's Crown Is Victory is a 2013 EP by British doom metal band Solstice. It was originally released through the bands page on the website Bandcamp.

Track listing 
 "Fortress England" – 03:21
 "I Am the Hunter" – 09:00
 "Death's Crown Is Victory" – 09:47
 "Aequinoctium II" – 03:55

Personnel 
Paul Kearns – vocals
Rich Walker – guitar
Andy Whittaker – guitar
Ian "Izak Gloom" Buxton – bass guitar
James Ashbey – drums

References

2013 EPs
Solstice (doom metal band) albums